KwaZulu-Natal Dune Forest is a subtropical forest type that was once found almost continuously along the coastal dunes of KwaZulu-Natal, South Africa. This vegetation type develops in sheltered areas behind the littoral zone, where with some protection from the salt wind it may develop with canopies as tall as 30 m. It still exists in protected areas, but much has been degraded by human activity. Coastal dune forest covers approximately 1% of the land area of KwaZulu-Natal, and is a habitat type seriously threatened from human population pressure and development, particularly titanium mining.

List of trees (incomplete)
 Allophylus natalensis – Dune false currant
 Deinbollia oblongifolia – Dune soap-berry
 Dracaena aletriformis – Large-leaved dragon tree
 Euclea natalensis – Natal guarri
 Ficus burtt-davyi – Veld fig
 Mimusops caffra – Coastal red milkwood
 Sideroxylon inerme – White milkwood
 Strelitzia nicolai – Natal wild banana

Birds
The coastal dune forest is one of the main habitats of the spotted ground-thrush, which is threatened by the decline of these forests.

Invertebrates
During 1995, spiders were sampled from the herbaceous layer of coastal dune forests at Richards Bay, KwaZulu-Natal. Four stands were sampled in rehabilitating dune forest and one stand in a mature forest. Samples were taken for a two-month period and a total of 2955 spiders representing 23 families, 72 genera and 96 species were recorded.

See also
 Forests of KwaZulu-Natal

References

Bibliography
 Pooley, E. (1993). The Complete Field Guide to Trees of Natal, Zululand and Transkei. .
 Pooley, E. (1998). A Field Guide to Wild Flowers; KwaZulu-Natal and the Eastern Region. .
 Pooley, T. and Player, I. (1995). KwaZulu-Natal Wildlife Destinations. .

 

Geography of KwaZulu-Natal
Forests of South Africa